Partners In Leadership is an American company focused on leadership training and management consulting.

History
Founded in 1989 by Roger Connors and Tom Smith, Partners In Leadership has offices in Arizona, California, Georgia, Illinois, Massachusetts, Texas, and Utah. Corporate headquarters are located in Temecula, California.

Recognition
 Ranked as one of America’s fastest-growing private companies at #3,336 for Inc. magazine’s 2014 Inc. 5000.

Bibliography 
The founders of the organization have co-authored four books on the subject of workplace accountability.

References

Companies established in 1989